This is a list of chancellors (rectores magnifici) of Leiden University, as from 1575. Three Nobel laureates are among these  chancellors: Hendrik Lorentz, Heike Kamerlingh Onnes and Willem Einthoven.

16th century

1575–1600

17th century

1601–1620

1621–1640

1641–1660

1661–1680

1681–1700

18th century

1701–1720

1721–1740

1741–1760

1761–1780

1781–1800

19th century

1801–1820

1821–1840

1841–1860

1861–1880

1881–1900

20st century

1901–1920

1921–1940

1941–1960

1961–2000

21st century

See also 
List of Leiden University people

Literature 
 Harm Beukers [et al].: Album Scholasticum academiae Lugduno-Batavae MCMLXXV-MCMLXXXIX. (1575–1989), Leids Universiteits-Fonds, Leiden, 1991
 R.E.O. Ekkart: Athenae Batavae. De Leidse Universiteit / The University of Leiden 1575-1975. Universitaire Pers Leiden, 1975.  
 Icones Leidenses. Leiden, Universitaire Pers, 1973.

References

External links 
 Website Leiden University

Lists of office-holders in the Netherlands
Science-related lists
Leiden University
 
Leiden University